WBZN (107.3 FM) is a commercial radio station licensed to Old Town, Maine, and serving the Bangor, Maine area.  It is owned by Townsquare Media and it airs a Top 40/CHR radio format.  The studios and offices are on Acme Road in Brewer.

WBZN has an effective radiated power (ERP) of 50,000 watts.  The transmitter is off Miller Way in Alton.

History
The station first signed on the air on January 1, 1995. Previously, various owners attempted to put it on the air beginning in 1990.  A construction permit for 107.3 was issued by the Federal Communications Commission in 1990 with the working call sign WUMC, but that version never made it to the airwaves.

Eclipse Broadcasting bought the construction permit in 1993 for $55,000.  When the station finally launched, the station's call letters were WBZN and it aired a "Greatest Hits of the 70s" classic hits format.  Eclipse Broadcasting was started by Chuck Foster and Mike Elliott. During that period, WBZN began calling itself Z107.3.

The station was heavily involved with Eastern Maine Medical Center's Children's Miracle Network charities spearheaded by Sales Manager Greg Carpenter.

In 1998, Cumulus Media, one of America's largest radio station owners, bought WBZN and sister station WQCB for $6.4 million. In August 2013, Cumulus decided to leave Maine and sold the radio stations to Townsquare Media.

On-air staff
Current on-air staff includes: 
The Z Morning Show with Kid and Sabrina
Paul Wolfe
Chuck Foster

Former Logo

External links
Z107.3 website

References

BZN
Mass media in Penobscot County, Maine
Contemporary hit radio stations in the United States
Radio stations established in 1996
Townsquare Media radio stations
1996 establishments in Maine